Eileen Olszewski (born September 17, 1968) is the first female boxer from Hawaii to achieve international success at the professional and amateur levels. She is the oldest professional flyweight boxer, male or female, to win a share of the world flyweight title in history.

Amateur career 
During her three-year reign in the amateurs, Olszewski fought in the 112 lb. division, with a record of 28–0 (7 TKO's) in the national level amateur competition and a 3–4 (2 TKO) record at the international level.  Olszewski completed her amateur career in 2003 and began boxing professionally in 2006.

Professional career 
Olszewski turned pro at age 38 in November 2006 and was undefeated in her first six professional bouts. Olsewski drew and lost for the WBC female world flyweight title, lost for the IBA female world light flyweight title, and won the WIBA and Global Boxing Union world flyweight titles. On September 25, 2013, Olszewski, age 45, still ranked tenth in the world among female flyweights on BoxRec, became the oldest world flyweight champion, male or female, when she stopped Patricia Alcivar in the eighth round of their scheduled ten round world championship bout, to win a share of the world flyweight title.  On November 10, 2014, Olszewski became the oldest current World Champion in the entire sport of boxing. Under  Manager  David Selwyn, Olszewski won 3 World titles.

Professional boxing record

References

External links 
 

1968 births
Living people
Boxers managed by Brian Cohen
World boxing champions
American women boxers
American sportspeople of Japanese descent
Boxers from Hawaii
Sportspeople from Hawaii
Flyweight boxers
21st-century American women